Tetris Splash is a puzzle video game, part of the Tetris games, was published by Microsoft Game Studios for the Xbox 360 via Xbox Live Arcade. It is the first game produced by Tetris Online, Inc.

The game gets its name from the aquarium background and water-themed music. Tetris Splash was released on the Xbox Live Arcade on October 3, 2007.

Gameplay

The game is typical Tetris gameplay, with support for up to six players in online multiplayer, and up to four players in same-machine multiplayer. Multiplayer includes team play as well (i.e. 3 teams of 2, designated "Red", "Green" and "Blue" teams.) Gameplay follows the trend of rewarding T-Spins, but also adds a new element of combos, where multiple consecutive pieces each clear lines with no "non-line clearing" pieces in between.

Game modes
There are several game modes available.

Single player
Marathon: Similar to Classic Tetris game play. Goes up to level 15.
40 Lines: Clear 40 lines as fast as possible.

Multiplayer
Same machine: Up to four players. Last survivor wins.
Online ranked: Six player free-for-all, playing for TrueSkill ranking.
Online unranked: Allows customization, including Team Mode, in which teams play against each other, instead of free-for-all.

Screensaver
The game also includes an aquarium screensaver, which the user can personalize. Initially, the game comes with the option to make the tank a fresh water or salt water tank. Only two types of fish come with the main game: goldfish (for the fresh water tank) and clownfish (for the salt water tank).

On first day of release, nine downloadable fish bundles were offered, which included Marine Angelfish, Guppy, Triggerfish, Tetra, Tang, Discus, Butterflyfish, Arowana, and Angelfish to add to the tank. Four decor packs were also offered, which included a Scuba theme, a Pirate theme, a Graveyard theme, and an Atlantis theme to add objects to the tank.

Reception

The game received "mixed" reviews according to the review aggregation website Metacritic.

References

External links
 

2007 video games
Microsoft games
Puzzle video games
Tetris
Video games developed in the United States
Xbox 360 Live Arcade games
Xbox 360-only games
Xbox 360 games
Multiplayer and single-player video games